The Sierra La Culata National Park Also Sierra de la Culata National Park is a national park of Venezuela that is located in the northeastern branch of the Venezuelan Andes, in the states Mérida and Trujillo. It was decreed a national park on December 7, 1989.

The vegetation is characterized by the presence of numerous species of frailejones, shrubs such as ericaceae and melastomataceae; ferns and numerous mosses, liver lichens and fungi. The tree of the zone is the Coloradito.

This park houses species such as the Jaguar, the Spectacled bear, the Armadillo, the Loach, the Andean condor, and amphibians such as the nurse frog (sapito niñera).

Within the park are at least one endemic species of brachythermal butterfly (Round empetrus).

Gallery

See also
List of national parks of Venezuela
Morrocoy National Park

References

National parks of Venezuela
Protected areas established in 1989
1989 establishments in Venezuela
Geography of Portuguesa (state)
Tourist attractions in Portuguesa (state)
Geography of Mérida (state)
Tourist attractions in Mérida (state)